Baron Ervin Roszner (19 December 1852 - 2 October 1928) was a Hungarian politician, who served as Minister besides the King between 1915 and 1917.

References
 Magyar Életrajzi Lexikon

1852 births
1928 deaths
People from Nógrád County
Foreign ministers of Hungary
Lord-lieutenants of a county in Hungarian Kingdom